L'istruttoria è chiusa: dimentichi  (internationally released as The Case Is Closed, Forget It) is a 1971 Italian crime drama film directed by Damiano Damiani.

It is based on the novel Tante Sbarre (trad. "Many Bars"), written by Leros Pittoni. It was awarded at the Tehran Film Festival.

Cast 
Franco Nero: Vanzi
Georges Wilson: Campoloni
John Steiner: Biro
Riccardo Cucciolla: Pesenti
Ferruccio De Ceresa: Warden 
Turi Ferro: Chef of Prison Guards 
Luigi Zerbinati: Zagarella
Enzo Andronico: Pesenti's lawyer
Claudio Nicastro: Salvatore Rosa
Corrado Solari: Crotta
Damiano Damiani: Vanzi's lawyer
Patrizia Adiutori: Milena

References

External links

1971 films
Films directed by Damiano Damiani
1971 crime drama films
Italian prison films
Films scored by Ennio Morricone
1970s Italian films